We Are What We Are can refer to:

 We Are What We Are (2010 film), a 2010 Mexican film
 We Are What We Are (2013 film), a 2013 American film
 "We Are What We Are", a song by Sonata Arctica on the album The Ninth Hour